The 1st Nevada Infantry Battalion was in infantry unit raised for service for the Union Army during the American Civil War.  

Authorization was given to raise a full regiment.  Charles Sumner was commissioned colonel with A. W. Briggs as lieutenant colonel and John G. Paul as major.  The unit, however, never reached full regimental strength and these officers were not mustered into service.  Three companies were organized at Fort Churchill, Nevada Territory beginning in 1863.

Organization

References
Organization compiled from Journal of the Senate - Nevada Legislature p. 40-46.

Units and formations of the Union Army from Nevada
Pacific Coast Theater of the American Civil War
1864 establishments in Nevada
Military units and formations established in 1864
Military units and formations disestablished in 1865